All Men Are Brothers is a 2011 Chinese television series adapted from Shi Nai'an's 14th century novel Water Margin, one of the Four Great Classical Novels of Chinese literature. The series is directed by Kuk Kwok-leung and features cast members from mainland China, Taiwan and Hong Kong. The series was first broadcast on 8TV in March 2011 in Malaysia.

List of episodes

Cast

Liangshan heroes

 Ray Lui as Chao Gai
 Zhang Hanyu as Song Jiang
 Wang Jianxin as Lu Junyi
 Calvin Li as Wu Yong
 Jing Gangshan as Gongsun Sheng
 Bao Li Gao as Guan Sheng
 Hu Dong as Lin Chong
 Zhao Qiusheng as Qin Ming
 Yan Hongzhi as Huyan Zhuo
 Zhang Di as Hua Rong
 Huang Haibing as Chai Jin
 Bai Jiancai as Li Ying
 Yu Yankai as Zhu Tong
 Jin Song as Lu Zhishen
 Chen Long as Wu Song
 Yu Bo as Dong Ping
 Zhang Xiaochen as Zhang Qing
 Gao Hu as Yang Zhi
 Wang Li as Xu Ning
 Liu Hailong as Suo Chao
 Yu Boning as Dai Zong
 Kou Zhanwen as Liu Tang
 Kang Kai as Li Kui
 Han Dong as Shi Jin
 Sun Xiaofei as Mu Hong
 Bai Hailong as Lei Heng
 Yu Chengxi as Li Jun
 Zhao Shuai as Ruan Xiaoer
 Liu Ke as Zhang Heng
 Liu Difei as Ruan Xiaowu
 Wei Binghua as Zhang Shun
 Zhang Haoxiang as Ruan Xiaoqi
 Na Zhidong as Yang Xiong
 Liu Guanxiang as Shi Xiu
 Zhang Zichen as Xie Zhen
 Du Peng as Xie Bao
 Yan Kuan as Yan Qing
 Chen Cheng as Zhu Wu
 Na Jiawei as Huang Xin
 Yang Yi as Sun Li
 Pan Ge as Xuan Zan
 Sun Donghao as Hao Siwen
 Duan Yang as Han Tao
 Chen Songtao as Peng Qi
 Zhu Jie as Shan Tinggui
 Jiang Xiaomeng as Wei Dingguo
 Bai Zhicheng as Xiao Rang
 Ji Qiansong as Pei Xuan
 Zhang Chong as Ou Peng
 Deng Fei as Deng Fei
 Wumaierjiang as Yan Shun
 Xia Tian as Yang Lin
 Geng Yi as Ling Zhen
 Tian Ye as Jiang Jing
 Sun Boyang as Lü Fang
 Yang Yang as Guo Sheng
 Chen Dacheng as An Daoquan
 Tian Wentao as Huangfu Duan
 Wang Chunyuan as Wang Ying
 Liu Xiaoxiao as Hu Sanniang
 Yang Bin as Bao Xu
 Liu Zhangyin as Fan Rui
 Wang Zengqi as Kong Ming
 Liu Liang as Kong Liang
 Ying Jun as Xiang Chong
 Zhou Mingyang as Li Gun
 Guo Xiao'an as Jin Dajian
 Zhang Chi as Ma Lin
 Hong Yiping as Tong Wei
 Hu Meng as Tong Meng
 Sun Jiandong as Meng Kang
 Li Haishan as Hou Jian
 Zhang Xiaomin as Chen Da
 Peng Hongyu as Yang Chun
 Gao Hai as Zheng Tianshou
 Sun Fuli as Tao Zongwang
 Li Xiaolong as Song Qing
 He Xianwei as Yue He
 Dong Hai as Gong Wang
 Zi Liang as Ding Desun
 Liu Bo as Mu Chun
 Liu Yulong as Cao Zheng
 Guo Bo as Song Wan
 Gao Zhao as Du Qian
 Li Shu as Xue Yong
 Liu Zihe as Shi En
 Li Yonglin as Li Zhong
 Xie Zhang as Zhou Tong
 Liu Yong as Tang Long
 Qiu Feng as Du Xing
 Wu Kegang as Zou Yuan
 Wang Fei as Zou Run
 Yuan Min as Zhu Fu
 Li Shengyu as Zhu Gui
 Li Guoping as Cai Fu
 Zheng Xilong as Cai Qing
 Lü Yuantian as Li Li
 Ge Min as Li Yun
 Kou Jun as Jiao Ting
 Li Haidong as Shi Yong
 Zhang Jinhe as Sun Xin
 Hu Ke as Gu Dasao
 Mao Zhu as Zhang Qing
 He Jiayi as Sun Erniang
 Cui Yang as Wang Dingliu
 Ge Zi as Yu Baosi
 Liu Guanlin as Bai Sheng
 Liu Fengchao as Shi Qian
 Chen Lianghao as Duan Jingzhu

Others

 Yang Zi as Emperor Huizong
 Ady An as Li Shishi
 Xue Zhongrui as Cai Jing
 Zhou Mingcan as Tong Guan
 Waise Lee as Gao Qiu
 Tong Dawei as Su Dongpo
 Anita Yuen as Lin Chong's wife
 Yang Niansheng as Su Yuanjing
 Jin Ke as Chen Wanshan
 Zhang Tielin as Hong Xin
 Liu Xiao Ling Tong as Squire Kong
 Qi Huai as Wen Da
 Wang Xinran as Fu'an
 Yin Fuwen as Shi Wenbin
 He Shengwei as Liang Shijie
 Zhao Yiyang as Gao Yanei
 Song Dong as Lu Qian
 Liu Bingfeng as "Yuhou" Li
 Wang Yiwei as Zhang Ganban
 Wang Jianguo as Wang Jin
 Li Haohan as Wang Lun
 Sun Lihua as Cheng Wan'er
 Du Chun as Ximen Qing
 Gan Tingting as Pan Jinlian
 Qiang Long as Wu Dalang
 Hu Guangzi as Zhang Wenyuan
 Xie Ning as Butcher Zheng
 Han Dong as Jiang the Door God
 Ji Chunhua as Luan Tingyu
 Xu Xiangdong as Shi Wengong
 Jiang Shouzhi as Ye Qing
 Ma Zijun as Elder Zhizhen / Zhou Tong
 Yang Yongjie as Zeng Tu
 Wang Yanming as Zeng Mi
 Xu Shuo as Zeng Suo
 Yin Hailong as Zeng Kui
 Chen Guoliang as Zeng Sheng
 Wang Duhao as Cui Daocheng
 Gao Quanjun as Qiu Xiaoyi
 Wu Qingzhe as Fang La
 Ren Xihong as Pang Wanchun
 Meng Yao as Pan Qiaoyun
 Fu Lei as Zhu Biao
 Xie Xian as Yulan
 Wang Mian as Ying'er
 Bi Xiuru as Yan Po
 Xiong Naijin as Yan Xijiao
 Huang Yingxuan as Qiongying
 Ding Zishuo as Jin Cuilian
 Xu Wanqiu as Li Ruilan
 Wang Zixuan as Lu Jinzhi
 Wang Wenting as Bai Xiuying
 Chen Lili as Madam Jia
 Ma Youxi as Madam Cui
 Yi Dan as Liu Gao's wife
 Ge Siran as Liu Jinniang
 Yang Qing as Granny Wang
 Wang Yining as Xu Ning's wife
 Li Wenzhen as Granny Li
 Xiao Yuyu as Yue'er
 Liu Meilin as Jin'er
 Qi Xunfei as Chunxiang
 Hai Bo as Immortal Zhang
 Li Xi'er as Li Qiaonu
 Ren Yuan as Shi Bao

Soundtrack

The music for the series was composed by Zhou Zhiyong.

Track list

Hong Kong release
The Hong Kong release features a different opening and ending theme song from the original version. Both are sung in Cantonese.

Broadcasts

Re-broadcasts

Production
Wu Ziniu was initially directing the series, but had switched to work on Great Porcelain Merchant as the shooting of All Men Are Brothers was delayed. He was replaced by Hong Kong television series director Kuk Kwok-leung. Art director Zheng Xiaolong said that he felt that Wu would be more suitable as the director, but he also expressed confidence in Kuk.

There were rumours that Fan Bingbing would be portraying Pan Jinlian. However, during the opening ceremony, Fan's spokesperson denied those claims and accused the production team of using Fan's name as a means of advertising the series. She added that Fan will only participate in projects her own company is involved in. Zheng Shuang, who played Hu Sanniang in The Water Margin (1997), also expressed interest in taking on the (more challenging) role of Pan Jinlian. However, Gan Tingting was eventually cast as Pan Jinlian.

Photos of actor Wu Yue dressed in ancient Chinese armour and posing in various martial arts stances appeared on the Internet around late 2009. There were rumours about the photos being a preview to Lin Chong's character design in the upcoming All Men Are Brothers. Wu's spokesperson claimed that Wu did not receive an official invitation from the production team of All Men Are Brothers to join the project, although he did interact with them. The photos are actually part of a wuxia themed series of pictures used to promote the 2008 Summer Olympics.

There were rumours that Deng Chao, Nie Yuan, Tong Dawei and Huang Xiaoming are part of the cast. Huang, who was initially a popular choice for the role of Yan Qing,  claimed that he did not receive any notice and is unable to join the project due to his schedule. Deng was considered by Wu Ziniu for playing Song Jiang. Nie was initially confirmed to portray Lin Chong, but an online poll found that Nie ranked behind another actor, Yu Bo, in terms of popularity for playing Lin Chong, even though the poll was not a factor in determining which actor would be cast. Both Nie and Deng had expressed interest in taking on the role of Ximen Qing.

See also
 The Water Margin (film)
 The Water Margin (1973 TV series)
 Outlaws of the Marsh (TV series)
 The Water Margin (1998 TV series)

Awards and nominations

References

External links
  All Men Are Brothers on Sina.com

Works based on Water Margin
Television series set in the Northern Song
2011 Chinese television series debuts
2011 Chinese television series endings
Fictional depictions of Su Shi in television
Chinese wuxia television series
Dragon Television original programming
Anhui Television original programming
Shandong Television original programming
Tianjin Television original programming